Platense may refer to:

Club Atlético Platense (Uruguay), a football club based in Montevideo, Uruguay
Club Atlético Platense, a football club based in Florida, Buenos Aires, Argentina
Platense F.C., a football club based in Puerto Cortés, Cortés, Honduras
C.D. Platense Municipal Zacatecoluca, a football club based in Zacatecoluca, La Paz, El Salvador
Platense, a demonym for the city of La Plata, Buenos Aires, Argentina
Platense, a demonym for the Río de la Plata Basin of Argentina and Uruguay
Sisyrinchium platense, a flowering plant of family Iridaceae

See also
Rioplatense Spanish, a dialect spoken in the Río de la Plata Basin